Cartwheels in a Sari: A Memoir of Growing Up Cult is a memoir written by Jayanti Tamm, published in 2009, describing her life as a disciple of Indian-American spiritual leader Sri Chinmoy.

Tamm, who was born into Chinmoy's organization, claims in the book that Chinmoy predicted she would become his perfect disciple. She was banished from the group when she was 25. Cartwheels in a Sari describes her life in the guru's inner circle and her efforts to break free from his influence.

According to the book, Chinmoy banned sex, and most disciples were directed to remain single. The book also states that the guru disparaged secular education, and his prohibitions included the consumption of alcohol, caffeine, and meat; dancing; dating; socializing with outsiders; and owning pets, although he kept a collection of exotic pets in his Queens basement.

In her introduction to the book, Tamm notes that the 7,000 other Chinmoy followers around the world, and others who encountered Chinmoy, are likely to have had different experiences and perceptions.

An audio version of the book was released on April 1, 2010.

Photo gallery

References

External links
 JayantiTamm.com  –  Official website
 "Leaving a Cult"  by Jayanti Tamm (April 2009)
 Author interview from Religion Dispatches (May 2009)
 Meet the Author: Jayanti Tamm at Darien Library (video, 1.25 hours; July 2009)

2009 non-fiction books
Sri Chinmoy
American biographies
Harmony Books books